Anger's Block is a historic commercial building in Winona, Minnesota, United States.  Built in 1872, it is one of the oldest surviving commercial buildings in Winona's central business district.  The building was listed on the National Register of Historic Places in 1978 for its local significance in the theme of architecture.  It was nominated for its early status among Winona's downtown buildings, which is furthered by the survival of its original architectural plans.  In 1998 the building was also listed as a contributing property to the Winona Commercial Historic District.

See also
 National Register of Historic Places listings in Winona County, Minnesota

References

1872 establishments in Minnesota
Buildings and structures in Winona, Minnesota
Commercial buildings completed in 1872
Commercial buildings on the National Register of Historic Places in Minnesota
Individually listed contributing properties to historic districts on the National Register in Minnesota
Italianate architecture in Minnesota
National Register of Historic Places in Winona County, Minnesota